Sin Nam-ho (born 2 January 1960) is a North Korean sport shooter who competed in the 1992 Summer Olympics.

References

1960 births
Living people
North Korean male sport shooters
Skeet shooters
Olympic shooters of North Korea
Shooters at the 1992 Summer Olympics
Shooters at the 1982 Asian Games
Shooters at the 1990 Asian Games
Shooters at the 2002 Asian Games
Asian Games medalists in shooting
Asian Games gold medalists for North Korea
Asian Games silver medalists for North Korea
Asian Games bronze medalists for North Korea
Medalists at the 1982 Asian Games
Medalists at the 1990 Asian Games
20th-century North Korean people